Korolevo is a rural locality (a village) in Dobryansky District, Perm Krai, Russia. The population was 5 as of 2010.

Geography 
Korolevo is located 22 km northeast of Dobryanka (the district's administrative centre) by road. Bolshoye Zapolye is the nearest rural locality.

References 

Rural localities in Dobryansky District